Cotton bollworm is a problem in growing cotton. "A major pest in hot countries of irrigated crops. Enters into a summer diapause when irrigated crops are not present and the soil and air temperatures are high. When the end of the dry season comes, the rain cools the soil and pupae come out of diapause." (Nibouche 2004)

 Diparopsis castanea, red bollworm: central-southern Africa 
 Earias insulana, spiny bollworm: Africa
 Helicoverpa zea, the American bollworm or tomato grub
 Helicoverpa armigera, the Old World bollworm
 Pectinophora gossypiella, pink bollworm: Africa
 Pectinophora scutigera, pink-spotted bollworm: Australia

See also 
 Bollworm

Former disambiguation pages converted to set index articles
Agricultural pest insects